Colpodellida is an order of alveolate eukaryotes, which includes small predatory species such as Colpodella pugnax. They are active predatory flagellates that consume small protists. However they do not fully ingest the prey, rather they absorb or suck the contents from the prey partially or fully. This method of sucking the contents from the prey is termed as mizocytosis.

References

Apicomplexa orders